The sombre nightjar or dusky nightjar (Caprimulgus fraenatus) is a species of nightjar in the family Caprimulgidae.
It is native to East Africa.

References

sombre nightjar
Birds of East Africa
sombre nightjar
Taxonomy articles created by Polbot